Datnioides undecimradiatus, commonly known as the Mekong tiger perch is a freshwater fish native to the Mekong basin in Indochina. It is considered to be the smallest Datnioides. This species looks similar to D. pulcher but has a smaller body. The scales are white-yellow or green and smaller dark stripes with only 5–6 lines.

They were caught for local consumption and there is a gathering for resale as an aquarium fish like other species in their family. They are abundant in the Mun river in the area of Ubon Ratchathani province from January to April. The Department of Fisheries of Thailand has succeeded in breeding since 1982.

References

Percoidei
Fish of Thailand
Fish described in 1994